"Foolish Games" is a song by American singer-songwriter Jewel from her debut studio album, Pieces of You (1995). It was also the third single to be lifted from the Batman & Robin motion-picture soundtrack. Jewel re-recorded the single for the soundtrack to produce a more radio-friendly version, similar to her other singles "Who Will Save Your Soul" and "You Were Meant for Me". This version is shorter than the album version by one verse. The song details the frustration and agony of knowing that the intensity of one's love is not reciprocated by one's lover.

A CD single for the song was not issued in the United States, but a re-released version of the "You Were Meant for Me" CD single had a hidden bonus track of the single version of "Foolish Games". Because of this, instead of debuting and charting on the Billboard Hot 100 in the traditional way, "Foolish Games" was able to continue the chart life of "You Were Meant for Me". The latter, which had peaked at number two and was spending its 41st week on the chart, rebounded to number 12 as "Foolish Games/You Were Meant for Me", eventually peaking at number seven eight weeks later. As a result, Billboard listed "Foolish Games" as peaking at number two despite the song never actually reaching that position. "Foolish Games/You Were Meant for Me" was listed as the second-best performing song of 1997 by Billboard.

The single is ranked at number 20 on Billboards All Time Top 100 and held the Guinness World Record for the longest chart run of a single, 65 weeks, but this achievement has since been surpassed multiple times. Jewel was also nominated for Grammy Award for Best Female Pop Vocal Performance for "Foolish Games". The song was included on Jewel's Greatest Hits as a duet with Kelly Clarkson.

Critical reception
Stephen Thomas Erlewine from AllMusic described the song as "superior". Chuck Taylor from Billboard stated that it is the "quintessential musical moment" of the Pieces of You album. He wrote that "the vocally sweeping ballad offers the richest arrangement among her hits, with lyrics that affectingly express the emotional descent of a woman whose love is unappreciated, perhaps even unseen, by her object of affection". The magazine also noted that "this piano-anchored ballad places the singer/songwriter in a setting that is almost orchestral and far more lush than those of her previous hits". A reviewer from The Daily Vault said "Foolish Games" "works because of the wailing chorus both tired and yearning". 

David Browne from Entertainment Weekly compared Jewel to British singer Kate Bush on the track, in his review. Australian music channel Max placed the song at number 503 in their list of "1000 Greatest Songs of All Time" in 2011. British magazine Music Week wrote, "This 22-year-old Alaskan singer-songwriter has a voice that simply demands your attention and this song of emotional entanglement complements it wonderfully. A gem." Ed Masley from Pittsburgh Post-Gazette described it as an "emotional ballad" with a "chilling climax". Sal Cinquemani from Slant called it "a female-centric take" on Leonard Cohen's "Famous Blue Raincoat", and noted that "Foolish Games" "remains one of the great pop songs of the '90s, buoyed by the singer's impeccably wrenching vocal performance".

Music video
The accompanying music video for "Foolish Games" was directed by American artist, photographer, director, and creative director Matthew Rolston. It is almost colorless and features Jewel performing the song in a pale and barren landscape. Some scenes also feature her riding a horse.

Track listings
 US promo CD
 "Foolish Games" (radio edit) – 4:00

 European and Australian CD single
 "Foolish Games" (radio edit) – 4:00
 "Angel Needs a Ride" – 4:17
 "Everything Breaks" – 3:21

Charts

Weekly charts

Year-end charts

Decade-end charts

All-time charts

Certifications

References

1990s ballads
1997 singles
1995 songs
Atlantic Records singles
Batman (1989 film series)
Batman music
Jewel (singer) songs
Kelly Clarkson songs
Music videos directed by Matthew Rolston
Pop ballads
Songs about heartache
Songs written by Jewel (singer)